Shanika is a given name. Notable people with the name include:

 Shanika Bruce (born 1995), Barbadian cricketer
 Shanika Karunasekera, engineer
 Shanika Minor (born 1991), American criminal
 Shanika Roberts-Odle, Barbadian politician
 Shanika Warren-Markland, British actress

Feminine given names